Oregon Route 66 is an Oregon state highway that runs between the cities of Ashland and Klamath Falls.  The highway is known as the Green Springs Highway No. 21 (see Oregon highways and routes), and is signed east-to-west.

Route description

Oregon Route 66 begins (at its western terminus) at an intersection with Oregon Route 99 just east of downtown Ashland.  The highway heads northeast, crosses and intersects with Interstate 5, and continues east along the northern edge of the Siskiyou Mountains.  Before ascending into the mountains, it passes alongside Emigrant Reservoir.  Six miles east of Ashland, the highway intersects with Oregon Route 273, near the Klamath Falls Junction.

The highway then passes over the mountains.  The highway ends at an interchange with U.S. Route 97 in Klamath Falls; just west of this interchange the highway intersects and briefly overlaps Oregon Route 140.  OR 140 continues east of the US 97 interchange, past the Klamath Falls airport, and eventually towards Lakeview.

Prior to 1934, the stretch of OR 66 between Klamath Falls Junction and Klamath Falls was signed as US 97; when the highway between Klamath Falls and Weed, California was completed, that route became US 97, and the Green Springs Highway became OR 66.  At that time, OR 66 west of Klamath Falls Junction (and OR 273 south of there) was U.S. Route 99; in 1938 a new route over Siskiyou Pass was completed, and the highway assumed its current configuration.

Major intersections

References

066
Transportation in Jackson County, Oregon
Transportation in Klamath County, Oregon